Salekhard Airport  is an airport in Yamalo-Nenets Autonomous Okrug, Russia located  north of Salekhard. It is a civilian airfield, handling medium-sized aircraft. It is also a designated emergency airfield for commercial airliner cross-polar routes.

Airlines and destinations

External links

Salekhard Airport official website

References

Airports built in the Soviet Union
Airports in the Arctic
Airports in Yamalo-Nenets Autonomous Okrug
Salekhard